Erik Thompson (born July 22, 1959 in La Jolla, California) is an American voice actor and television announcer.

Career 
After starting out as a disc jockey in San Diego and Los Angeles radio, he began pursuing a career in voiceover. Thompson eventually found work as a promotional voice of HBO, which led to promotional announcements and program narration on several other networks.

His work includes narrating the TV series The Universe on The History Channel, Crimes of the Century on CNN, World's Most Amazing Videos and many other television series featured on Discovery Channel, The Science Channel, The History Channel, NBC, MSNBC, The Weather Channel, National Geographic Channel, Spike and CNN.

Thompson has performed voice-overs for hundreds of national television and radio commercials, non-broadcast narration, television infomercials, animated voice and web-based content.

As a promotional voice, he has at various times been a fixture of several television networks, including  Ion Television, National Geographic Channel, Nat Geo Wild, FX, CBS, NBC, HBO, Animal Planet, Showtime, TBS, Discovery Channel, Investigation Discovery, and others. He also is the promotional voice of several local affiliate stations across the United States.

Filmography

References

External links 
 
 Erik Thompson at "Where Are They Now?" LA Radio.com
 Erik Thompson article on People SD Reader: The rise of 91X, the demise of its original DJs

People from La Jolla, San Diego
American male voice actors
American radio personalities
American radio producers
Television producers from California
1959 births
Living people
Male actors from San Diego